Kiki and Herb Will Die for You: Live at Carnegie Hall is a live album by drag cabaret duo Kiki and Herb. The album was recorded on September 19, 2004 at Carnegie Hall in New York City, and released on February 1, 2005.

Track listing
Act One / Disc One
"Close to it All" – 2:01
Medley: "Note to Self: Don't Die / Flamingo / When Doves Cry" – 5:23
"Opening Remarks" (Monologue) – 2:32
"Why" – 4:05 (also quotes "I Do Not Want This")
"Hoochie Coochie" (Monologue) – 4:35
"Sex Bomb" – 3:11
"Yasaweh" (Monologue) – 9:48
"Has Anyone Ever Written Anything for You?" – 4:28
"The Saddest Day of My Life" (Monologue) – 11:00
"A Lover Spurned" – 5:39
"Bored, Bored, Bored" (Monologue) – 6:54
"The Windmills of My Mind" – 5:45
"I Was Meant for the Stage" – 3:45
"No Children" - 3:07
"Rainbow Connection" – 3:36

Act Two / Disc Two
"Piña Colada Song" – 1:13
"Institutionalized" – 5:59
"Jazz" (Monologue) – 0:39
"The Paris Match" – 5:16
"I've Got to Go to Vietnam" (Monologue) – 6:46
"The Revolution Medley: The Revolution Will Not Be Televised / Release Yo' Self / Lose Yourself / Once in a Lifetime" – 5:05
"Dominique" – 3:13
"Show Business Martyrs" (Monologue) – 9:20
"The Thin Ice" – 1:40
"Love Will Tear Us Apart" – 3:17
"Temptation" – 4:36
 Medley: "Love Is a Battlefield / Total Eclipse of the Heart / Turn, Turn, Turn / You Turn Me On (I'm a Radio) / The Second Coming" – 7:31
"Those Were the Days" – 7:16
"Tonight's the Kind of Night" – 7:01
"Ladies and Gentlemen We Are Floating in Space" – 1:36
"Running Up that Hill" – 5:28

Kiki and Herb albums
2005 live albums
Albums recorded at Carnegie Hall